Pieter van Andel (born 11 December 1969) is a Dutch rower. He competed in the men's quadruple sculls event at the 1996 Summer Olympics.

References

External links
 

1969 births
Living people
Dutch male rowers
Olympic rowers of the Netherlands
Rowers at the 1996 Summer Olympics
Sportspeople from Hastings